Manhattoe/Manhattoes is a term describing a place and, mistakenly, a people. The location was the very southern tip of the Manhattan island during the time of the Dutch colonization of the Americas at what became New Amsterdam there.  The people were a band of the Wappinger known as the Weckquaesgeek, native to an area further north in what is now Westchester County, who controlled the upper three-quarters of the island as a hunting ground.

As was common practice early in the days of European settlement of North America, a people came to be associated with a place, with its name displacing theirs among the settlers and those associated with them, such as explorers, mapmakers, trading company superiors who sponsored many of the early settlements, and officials in the settlers' mother country in Europe.

Because of this early conflation there is enduring confusion over whether "Manhattoe/Manhattoes" were a people or a place.  There is certainty it was a place, at the very tip of Manhattan Island, so referred to by the Dutch, who evidently inherited the Native American name for the spot they chose to place their settlement (rather than named it after a people already living there, as the island was not permanently inhabited at the time of their 1609 arrival nor Peter Minuit's subsequent purchase of it from the Canarse Indians for $24 in 1639).

Period accounts maintain that Manhattan island was used as a hunting ground by two tribes, the Canarse (Canarsee, or Canarsie)  of today's Brooklyn at its southern one-quarter and the Weckquaesgeek the rest, each having no more than temporary camps for hunting parties.

Manhattoes/Manhattans (place)

Manhattoes was the name of a Dutch settlement in New Netherlands in the early decades of their settlement there in the 1600s.  Located at the very southern tip of today's Manhattan Island, it was known by the native term by both the Dutch and the English who wished to displace them. Fort Nieuw Amsterdam was built in 1627, but the common name held fast.  Eventually, by the time of the incorporation of the settlement, the fort's name displaced the original, and "Manhattoes" became Nieuw Amsterdam in 1653.

The terms Manhattans and Manhatans were also used for the Manhattoes by some Dutch, giving rise to Manhattan island's contemporary name and conflation with a people (the Wecquaeskgeek) who neither occupied that part of the island nor went by that name.

Manhattoe/Manhattan (people)

Manhattoe, also Manhattan, was a name erroneously given to a Native American people of the lower Hudson River, the Weckquaesgeek, a Wappinger band which occupied the southwestern part of today's Westchester County. In the early days of Dutch settlement they utilized the upper three-quarters of Manhattan Island as a hunting grounds.

The people - Wecquaesgeek - became conflated with a place - the Manhattoes, regardless that it was the only part of the island they did not occupy.  Over time that term became "Manhattan" and "Manhattans" for those who hunted the vast majority of the island, as well as the name of the island.

Notes

References

See also
 Metoac

Algonquian ethnonyms
Algonquian peoples
Indigenous peoples of the Northeastern Woodlands
Native American history of New York (state)
Native American tribes in New York (state)
People of New Netherland